Thiry Daems is an unincorporated community in the town of Red River, Kewaunee County, Wisconsin, United States. The community was settled by Belgian immigrants and was named for a surveyor named Constant Thiry and a priest called Father Daems.

References

Belgian-American culture in Wisconsin
Unincorporated communities in Kewaunee County, Wisconsin
Unincorporated communities in Wisconsin